The inaugural North of Tyne mayoral election was held on 2 May 2019 to elect the first Mayor of the North of Tyne. The area is made up of Newcastle upon Tyne, North Tyneside and Northumberland. Subsequent elections will be held every five years.

Background 
The election followed the creation of the North of Tyne Combined Authority in November 2018, covering the area of Newcastle upon Tyne, North Tyneside and Northumberland councils. Councils which are not currently part of the devolution deal but were previously included in unsuccessful discussions to establish a mayor of the North East, Metropolitan Borough of Gateshead, Durham County Council, Sunderland City Council and South Tyneside Metropolitan Borough Council, were invited to join the authority.

Procedure 
This election uses the supplementary voting system, with electors having two votes. One vote for the first choice candidate, with an optional vote for a second choice candidate used if no candidate has more than 50% of the first choice votes.

Campaign 
Newcastle councillor Jamie Driscoll was announced as Labour's candidate in February 2019, having been elected on a platform of local procurement, promoting collective ownership, starting a "People's Bank", starting housing co-operatives and a renewable energy company. He defeated Newcastle City Council leader Nick Forbes to win the party's nomination.

The Liberal Democrats announced John Appleby, who was formerly head of mechanical engineering at Newcastle University, as their candidate in December 2018. He had previously been a councillor, mayoral candidate and parliamentary candidate.

Driscoll was the bookmakers' favourite, followed by Hoult.

Candidates

Labour 
Jamie Driscoll was selected as Labour's candidate for Mayor of the North of Tyne on 20 February 2019, with voting having taken place from late January 2019.

Labour required candidates to nominate themselves in November 2018, ahead of a shortlisting and nomination process culminating in a selection vote in January 2019. Paul Brannen, Jamie Driscoll, Nick Forbes and Ian Grayson nominated themselves at this point. Grayson withdrew from selection in December, announcing his support for Forbes.  To be on the selection ballot, candidates need at least two nominations from local parties or affiliated trade unions. The party re-opened self-nominations in December 2018 in the hope of improving the diversity of candidates available. North Tyneside councillor Karen Lee nominated herself in this round. Driscoll received nominations from five Constituency Labour Party's and four affiliated trade unions, whilst Forbes received nominations from four Constituency Labour Party's and five affiliated trade unions and Lee was nominated by two Constituency Labour Party's. Brannen withdrew with one nomination from a trade union. Lee withdrew in January, considering her late entry into the selection to have limited her campaign.

Driscoll was backed by Noam Chomsky, Clive Lewis, Ken Loach, Paul Mason, John McDonnell and Laura Pidcock. Forbes was backed by Andy Burnham, Brendan Foster and Norma Redfearn as well as former candidates Paul Brannen, Ian Grayson and Karen Lee.

Judith Kirton-Darling, Catherine McKinnell and Chi Onwurah had previously been discussed as potential candidates.

As Driscoll was also selected by the Co-operative Party, he will seek election as joint a Labour and Co-operative Party candidate.

Conservative 

The Conservative Party's selection process was due to conclude in early 2019. The party decided to delay selection until the Labour candidate was announced.

Business park manager Charlie Hoult announced that he'd be seeking the party's nomination in early March. He was endorsed by the property developer and former owner of Newcastle United F.C. John Hall. Former mayor of North Tyneside Linda Arkley announced her candidacy for the Conservative nomination on 8 March.

Charlie Hoult was named as the Conservative candidate on 15 March.

Former minister Martin Callanan, former parliamentary candidates Steve Kyte and Ian Levy, and former goalkeeper Steve Harper were previously discussed as potential candidates.

Liberal Democrats 

The Liberal Democrats selected former Newcastle Councillor John Appleby to be their candidate. Other people who were discussed as potential candidates included David Faulkner, the former leader of Newcastle City Council, Fiona Hall, a former MEP for North East England, former council group leader Anita Lower, former parliamentary candidate Julie Pörksen and councillor Greg Stone.

Green Party 
The Green Party did not contest the election due to the high (£5000) deposit required, and concerns that the way the combined authority had been set up did not represent "truly democratic devolution"

UK Independence Party 
The UK Independence Party selected former Conservative councillor Hugh Jackson as its candidate in April 2019. Jackson had resigned as a Conservative councillor in 2008 after once joking about using euthanasia to reduce the number of children in care as a response to Labour policy suggestions.

Independents 

John McCabe, businessman and then president of the North East England Chamber of Commerce, confirmed his intention to stand on 4 March 2019.

Jeremy Middleton, Ammar Mirza and David Ord were previously discussed as potential candidates.

Results
Source:

Results by local authority

Newcastle upon Tyne

North Tyneside

Northumberland

References 

2019 English local elections
Mayoral elections in England
May 2019 events in the United Kingdom
21st century in Tyne and Wear